The Bird and the Rifle is the ninth studio album by American singer-songwriter Lori McKenna, released on July 29, 2016, through CN Records. It includes the song "Humble and Kind", which was written by McKenna and first recorded by Tim McGraw for his 2015 album Damn Country Music. Despite the album's limited commercial success (it never charted on the Billboard 200), it earned critical acclaim and was nominated for Best Americana Album at the 59th Annual Grammy Awards.

Background 
In an interview with The Guardian, McKenna said that "there were more stories and characters on the last record, I felt like this record could be one character in different places in their life and relationships". Despite the album's focus on relationship breakdown, McKenna herself has not experienced it but says that "everybody, to one extent or another, knows the feeling". Of the title track, McKenna states that "people think it's a sad song, or they'll have to ask why I have a gun thing going on" but she reasons that "most people have felt that in a relationship".

The title of the record came from Haley's 21st Birthday, a sixth-season episode of Modern Family where two of the characters briefly debated getting matching bird and rifle tattoos. Of this, McKenna noted "you never know where song ideas are gonna come from", mentioning that she was ironing with the television on in the background when the idea originated.

The album was recorded live, the signature method of producer Dave Cobb, who was introduced to McKenna by the co-owner of her production company who wanted to encourage McKenna to record a new album despite the fact she didn't see her number of releases "increasing anytime soon". Of the decision to include "Humble and Kind", McKenna and Cobb were both in agreement.

"Humble and Kind" was covered by Tim McGraw for his 2015 album Damn Country Music. McGraw's version won the American Music Award for Favourite Country Song as well as the CMT Award for Video of the Year.

Critical reception 

The Bird and the Rifle received highly positive reviews from music critics. At Metacritic, which assigns a normalized rating out of 100 to reviews from mainstream critics, the album has an average score of 82 out of 100, which indicates "universal acclaim" based on 4 reviews.

Timothy Monger at AllMusic awarded the album four out of five stars and deemed it "another extremely strong effort for Lori McKenna, whose growing catalogue is already known for its quality." Ann Powers at NPR Music called The Bird and The Rifle "one of 2016's best releases", in part, due to "Humble and Kind", which manages to be "both widely resonant and specific". Powers also praised McKenna's voice, which she describes as "powerful but never grandiose, as if she's telling you something important but doesn't want to make a fuss."
Stephen Deusner from Pitchfork celebrated the track "We Were Cool", likening McKenna to Bruce Springsteen, stating that "McKenna knows that the power of a barbed lyric or a rich character relies on a bold melody and a patient vocal, and more than anything else her vocals put these songs across and make these stories relatable". Similarly, Jon Pareles of The New York Times also praised McKenna's voice as a "taut, lived in soprano that can take on a flutter or a rasp close to the country of earlier generations" and pointing out that the strength in her songwriting is the "mundane yet illuminating detail."

Accolades 
McKenna became the first solo woman since Jennifer Nettles in 2008 to win the Song of the Year award at the Country Music Association Awards and only the fifth solo female overall to win (following Nettles, Kimberly Perry, Gretchen Peters and K.T. Oslin). Furthermore, McKenna is the only woman to win the CMA award back-to-back for different songs (following 2015's Girl Crush) and only the fourth songwriter overall to do so (after Paul Overstreet, Don Schlitz and Vince Gill). "Humble and Kind" won the award for Best Country Song at the 59th Annual Grammy Awards, while the album was nominated for Best Americana Album, and "Wreck You" for Best American Roots Performance and Best American Roots Song.

Track listing

Personnel 
Credits adapted from AllMusic.

Musicians
Brian Allen - bass guitar
Dave Cobb - electric guitar, acoustic guitar, hi string guitar, Mellotron
Barry Dean - background vocals
Luke Laird - guitar
Hillary Lindsey - background vocals
Lori McKenna - vocals, guitar
Christopher Powell - drums
Kristen Rogers - background vocals
Mike "Mojo" Webb - piano, Mellotron

Technical Personnel
Evie Coates - illustrations
Dave Cobb - mixing, producer
Becky Fluke - photography
Pete Lyman - mastering
Matt Ross-Spang - mixing, engineer
Shane Stern - production coordination

Charts

Release history 
Source: Amazon.com

References 

Lori McKenna albums
2016 albums
Albums produced by Dave Cobb